Aras Corporation is an American developer and publisher of product development software, Aras Innovator. The product is used for product lifecycle management (PLM) and other purposes. Since 2007, Aras has been providing Aras Innovator for free as "Enterprise open-source software", with Aras Corp providing technical support, software updates, and other consulting as a subscription service. Aras Corp was founded in 2000 in Andover, Massachusetts by Peter Schroer.

Aras Innovator is an enterprise software suite for managing product lifecycle management business processes. The product is based on the Microsoft .NET Framework and SQL Server. The product is used for product lifecycle management (PLM), advanced product quality planning (APQP), lean product development, product quality control, collaborative product development and new product introduction (NPI).

Until 2007, Aras sold their product as proprietary software for enterprises.

In 2007, Aras began providing Aras Innovator as open-source software. Clients obtain the software for free, and Aras Corp provides technical support, software updates, and other consulting as a subscription service.

In July 2020, Aras confirmed the introduction of a new framework, Digital Twin Core, which introduces functionality for generating and handling digital twins to the Aras low-code package.  Aras Cloud PLM provides a secure, cost-effective, and scalable solution for customers who need to manage their product data in the cloud.

References

Further reading
 Boston Globe
 Computer World
 Boston Business Journal
 Design News
 Engineering.com

External links

Product lifecycle management
Business software companies
Software companies based in Massachusetts
Software companies of the United States
2000 establishments in Massachusetts
Companies based in Massachusetts
Software companies established in 2000
American companies established in 2000